On purge bébé (Baby's Laxative) is Jean Renoir's first sound film, based upon the play by Georges Feydeau. It is a 1931 comedy about a supposedly unbreakable chamberpot and a constipated baby. It is known for mocking the French bourgeoisie.

Renoir made the film in a record three weeks (from script to finished film) in order to get backing for other projects. His next film was La Chienne.

Synopsis
Mr. Follavoine seeks to sell unbreakable chamberpots to the French army. In an attempt to close the deal, he invites Chouilloux, an influential official of the Ministry of hosts, for dinner to discuss putting his chamberpots on the market. But on that same day, Follavoine's son is constipated and Mrs. Follavoine tries to force him to take his laxative, but he flat out refuses to take it. From that point on, nothing goes as planned.

Release
On 14 June 2016, American video-distribution company The Criterion Collection released On purge bébé, newly restored through a 4K digital transfer, as a bonus feature for the release of La Chienne on Blu-ray and DVD.

References 
 Kristin Thompson and David Bordwell, Film History: An Introduction.
 On purge bébé

External links
 

1931 films
1931 comedy films
French comedy films
1930s French-language films
Films based on works by Georges Feydeau
Films directed by Jean Renoir
French black-and-white films
French films based on plays
1930s French films